The Peirce Still House is an historic building located next to Rock Creek Park, at 2400 Tilden Street, Northwest, Washington, D.C.

The stone house was a distillery, built for Isaac Peirce. In 1924, it was converted to a home.

References

External links

Houses on the National Register of Historic Places in Washington, D.C.
Houses completed in 1811